The XIII Grand Prix d'Albi was a motor race, run to Formula One rules, held on 5 August 1951 at the Circuit Les Planques, Albi. The race was run over 34 laps of the circuit, and was won by French driver Maurice Trintignant in a Simca-Gordini Type 15. Trintignant also set pole and fastest lap. Louis Rosier and Louis Chiron were second and third in their Talbot-Lago T26Cs.

Results

References

Albi Grand Prix
Albi Grand Prix